The Quander Micropfeil is a German ultralight trike that was designed and is produced by UL Flugzeugbau Quander of Petershagen. The aircraft is supplied complete and ready to fly.

Design and development
The Micropfeil was designed to comply with the Fédération Aéronautique Internationale microlight category and the US FAR 103 Ultralight Vehicles rules. It features a cable-braced hang glider-style high wing, weight-shift controls, a single-seat open cockpit without a cockpit fairing, tricycle landing gear and a single engine in pusher configuration.

The aircraft is made from bolted-together aluminum tubing, with its double surface Schönleber Speed  wing covered in Dacron sailcloth. The  span wing is supported by a single tube-type kingpost and uses an "A" frame weight-shift control bar. The wing is supported by a two-tube structure. The powerplant is a twin-cylinder, air-cooled, two-stroke, single-ignition  Rotax 447 engine.

Specifications (Micropfeil with Schönleber Speed wing)

References

External links

Archives of the Quander website on Archive.org

2000s German sport aircraft
2000s German ultralight aircraft
Homebuilt aircraft
Single-engined pusher aircraft
Ultralight trikes